Where Are You is a 2021 American thriller film co-directed by Valentina De Amicis and Riccardo Spinotti from a screenplay by Amicis, Spinotti and Matt Handy. The film stars Anthony Hopkins, Camille Rowe, Madeline Brewer, Angela Sarafyan, Mickey Sumner and Ray Nicholson.

Cast
 Anthony Hopkins
 Camille Rowe
 Madeline Brewer 
 Angela Sarafyan
 Mickey Sumner
 Ray Nicholson
 Melora Walters
 Brad Greenquist
 Rita Taggart
 Irakli Kvirikadze

Release
The film was screened at the Locarno Festival in August 2021.

Reception
Alex Saveliev of Film Threat rated the film a 6 out of 10.

Matthew Joseph Jenner of the International Cinephile Society gave the film a positive review and wrote, "A meandering experimental drama set within the art world, the film exists at the intersection between art and existential philosophy, drawing inspiration from both areas and assimilating it flawlessly into the fabric of this enigmatic character study."

References

External links
 

American thriller films
2020s English-language films
2020s American films